The Hr1 class (original classification P1) was the largest passenger express steam locomotive built in Finland. Twenty-two were built between the years 1937–1957. They were numbered 1000–1021.

In the 1930s, there was a need for faster and heavier express trains in Finland, and the Hv1–Hv3 classes were not powerful enough to fill the need. Lokomo Oy in Tampere built first two prototypes, and after successful trials 20 more were built. 
Most of the locomotives were fitted with Wagner-type smoke deflectors, but the last two, which were equipped with roller bearings, had Witte-type deflectors.

The Hr1 was built for coal firing, but during the coal shortage after the war in 1945, birch wood was used as fuel. Larger chimneys needed for extinguishing wood sparks were temporarily fitted.

The Hr1s were the most important express steam locomotive and could justifiably be called the "flagships" of VR until 1963, when diesel locomotives started to replace steam. Their use ended officially in 1971, but two Hr1s equipped with roller bearings were brought back to use for a short time in the spring of 1974. One engine, 1005, was a participant in the worst peacetime railroad accident in Finland, the Kuurila accident, in 1957. The engine is preserved at Haapamäki.

Hr1's sister locomotive was the Tr1 class, otherwise similar, but with 2-8-2 wheel arrangement and smaller diameter drivers for freight train use.

Preservation
The following are preserved:
 1000 Haapamäki
 1001 Hyvinkää
 1002–1005 Haapamäki
 1008 Acton, Suffolk, England
 1009 Kouvola
 1010 Haapamäki
 1011 Otanmäki
 1012 Oulainen
 1014 Haapamäki
 1016 named "Lady Patricia" on a Private Railway near Windsor, Berkshire, United Kingdom
 1019, 1020 Haapamäki
 1021 Riihimäki

Gallery

See also 
 Finnish Railway Museum
 VR Group
 List of Finnish locomotives
 List of railway museums Worldwide
 Heritage railways
 List of heritage railways
 Restored trains
 Jokioinen Museum Railway
 History of rail transport in Finland
 VR Class Pr1
 VR Class Tk3
 VR Class Hr11
 Ukko-Pekka

References

External links
 
 1016 "Lady Patricia" on her test run 28 June 2013

Tampella locomotives
Hr1
4-6-2 locomotives
Railway locomotives introduced in 1937
Hr1
Passenger locomotives
5 ft gauge locomotives